The Solo Wings Windlass is a South African ultralight trike designed and produced by Solo Wings of Gillitts, KwaZulu-Natal. The aircraft was also sold in the United States by Bateleur Sky Sports of Palm Coast, Florida in the early 2000s, under their own name.

Design and development
It features a cable-braced hang glider-style high-wing, weight-shift controls, a two-seats-in-tandem open cockpit, tricycle landing gear and a single engine in pusher configuration.

The aircraft is made from tubing, with its wing covered in Dacron sailcloth. Its  span wing is supported by a single tube-type kingpost and uses an "A" frame control bar. The landing gear includes suspension on all three wheels and a steerable nose wheel. The aircraft has been used for flight training and for this role has dual controls, including dual ground steering. The standard engine supplied is the Rotax 503  twin cylinder, two-stroke, air-cooled aircraft engine.

In the early 2000s the company had planned to phase the Windlass out, but customer demand has kept the model in production through 2012.

Operational history

Specifications (2000 model Bateleur Windlass)

References

External links

1980s South African ultralight aircraft
Single-engined pusher aircraft
Ultralight trikes
Solo Wings aircraft